Amanda Johnston (born 1977) is an African-American poet. She was born in East St. Louis, Illinois, and currently resides in Round Rock/Austin, Texas. Amanda Johnston received a Master of Fine Arts degree in creative writing from the University of Southern Maine. She is a Stonecoast MFA faculty member, executive director and founder of Torch Literary Arts, and cofounder of #BlackPoetsSpeakOut.

An Affrilachian poet, former Cave Canem Foundation Board President, and Austin Project Fellow, Torch Literary Arts founder and a Black Poets Speak Out cofounder, Johnston is both a poet and performer. As an activist with Black Poets Speak Out, a video project consisting of African American poets protesting police misconduct with poetry, she has highlighted racial and social injustice in the United States.

Genesis 
Johnston is the creator of a style of poetry known as Genesis. It is a style consisting of five poems written in columns, and read from top to bottom, plus an additional sixth poem that is created by reading all five columns together, left to right, and a seventh poem that is created from italicized words and phrases in the five columns, which are also read left to right. The poems also must move chronologically through time.

Awards 

2016 Pushcart Prize Nominee, “Night Hike,” The Quarry, Split This Rock
2015 Split This Rock, Freedom Plow Award, Joint Finalist
2014 Poets & Writers, Grant
2015: Freedom Plow Award for Poetry & Activism Finalist
2005: Austin International Poetry Festival Christina Sergeyevna Award
2004: Kentucky Foundation for Women Artist Enrichment Grant
2003: Kentucky Foundation for Women Artist Enrichment Grant
"13 Black Poets You Should Know," Blavity
The Caribbean Writer’s Canute A. Brodhurst Prize in Short Fiction
Winner, John Edgar Wideman Mircrostory Contest
First Place, Detroit Writers Guild Paul Laurence Dunbar Poetry Contest
First Place, Oakland University Ekphrasis Poetry Contest

Selected works

Printed works 
2019 “History Repeating Repeating,” Thalia Magazine
2019 “Crossing In,” Thalia Magazine
2019 “forgive me, but another black woman has been killed and I’m shook,” Thalia Magazine
2018 “Code Switchin’,” Ice Cream Social Anthology
2017 “When My Daughter Wasn’t Assaulted,” Women of Resistance: Poems for a New Feminism Anthology
2017 “Photo: White Woman Sitting on Black Woman as Chair on MLK Day,” Women of Resistance: Poems for a New Feminism Anthology
2017 “Love is a Bloody Thing in the Dark,” Talking River
2017 “Another Morning Blessed Be,” Black Bone: 25 Years of Affrilachian Poets Anthology
2017 “Answer the Call,” Black Bone: 25 Years of Affrilachian Poets Anthology
2016 “When My Daughter Wasn’t Assaulted,” No, Dear Magazine
2016 “How to Eat Bread,” Harlequin Creature, Issue 8/9
2016 “On National Poetry Month,” Academy of American Poets for Poetry Magazine
2016 “Early,” The Plume Anthology of Poetry 4
2016 “Night Hike,” Full: An Anthology of Moon Poems
2015 “It Ain’t Prostitution,” Circ’s Lament: Anthology of Wild Women Poetry
2015 “Facing US,” Pluck!: The Journal of Affrilachian Arts & Culture
2014 “If I Should Disobey an Order,” Straylight Volume 7.22
2014 “For the Baby,” Straylight Volume 7.2
2013 “How to Drink Bourbon,” Small Batch: An Anthology of Bourbon Poetry
2013 “Red Birds,” Cabildo Quarterly
2012 “Thyme for Onions,” The New Sound: An Interdisciplinary Journal of Arts and Literature
2012 “Genesis,” The New Sound: An Interdisciplinary Journal of Arts and Literature
2010 “Oracle,” Reverie, Annual
2010 “Girlfriend There Is No Spoon,” Reverie, Annual
2009 “Buckle,” Reverie, Spring/Summer Vol. 3
2008 "Sparky Considers God's Hands" Cave Canem XI 2007 Anthology
2008 “Orange” The Journal of Affrilachian Arts & Culture
2008 “Making Brown” Pluck!: The Journal of Affrilachian Arts & Culture
2007 "A Burden of Flame: An interview with Amanda Johnston" Callaloo, Vol. 30, Number 4
2007 “Suburban Cows” New Literati
2007 “Pity” New Literati
2007 “Over Breakfast” His Rib, Penmanship Publishing
2007 “History Lesson” His Rib, Penmanship Publishing
2007 “Over Breakfast,” His Rib, Penmanship Publishing
2007 “History Lesson,” His Rib, Penmanship Publishing
2007 “Round,” Tempu Tupu, Africa World Press
2007 “Mourning,” Tempu Tupu, Africa World Press
2007 “Vacant Apartment,” Tempu Tupu, Africa World Press
2007 “Have you ever been convicted of a felony?” Tempu Tupu, Africa World Press
2007 “Bowing in the Church of Beauty” The Ringing Ear: Black Poets Lean South, Georgia Press
2006 “Bowing in the Church of Beauty” Sorin Oak Review
2006 “Origami” Sorin Oak Review
2005 "Cul-de-sac" Kudzu
2005 "Dissecting Heritage" Kudzu
2005 "Thyme for Onions" di-verse-city Anthology
2004 "Reading in Bed" di-verse-city Anthology
2004 "Baby Mama Drama" KRHN Newsletter
2003 "Four Line Depression" The Heartland Review
2002 "Animal Instinct" The Heartland Review
2002 "Miz Cassidy's Vision" The Heartland Review
2002 “If Iraq Happens" The Heartland Review

Electronic publications
2018 “When My Daughter Wasn’t Assaulted,” Lone Star Literary Review
2018 “Love is a Bloody Thing in the Dark,” In Their Own Words Feature, Poetry Society of America
2017 “We Named You Mercy.” Poem-A-Day, Academy of American Poets, Poets.org
2017 “When My Daughter Wasn’t Assaulted,” BillMoyers.com
2016 “Making Amends,” Stonecoast Review
2016 “Peeling Potatoes,” Stonecoast Review
2016 “I Embrace You,” Stonecoast Review
2016 “Hand to Mouth,” The Offing
2016 “Heirloom,” Puerto del Sol
2016 “Man Picking Cotton,” Puerto del Sol
2016 “Egg Wash,” Puerto del Sol
2014 “Mixed Blood,” Kinfolks Quarterly, Issue 2
2014 “Blade Speaks at Career Day,” Kinfolks Quarterly, Issue 2
2014 “Plea,” La Fovea
2014 “The Viewing,” La Fovea
2014 “Woman in Red Dress,” Tuesday Morning Love
2013 “Asylum,” Cabildo Quarterly
2012 “Transition,” Muzzle Magazine
2009 “Bomb Threat,” November 3 Club
2009 “Domicile,” The Drunken Boat
2009 “My Father as a Blooming Stem,” The Drunken Boat
2008 "Pinky Wants To Live" The Nubian Chronicles
2008 "Swimsuit" Un-Mute.com
2008 "First Song" Un-Mute.com
2006 “Bowing in the Church of Beauty” Cave Canem Featured Poem
2005 “Not Another Love Jones,” Old City Cool
2005 “Not My Husband,” Old City Cool
2003 "If Iraq Happens" Poets Against the War
2003 "Miz Cassidy's Vision" Poetry Repair Shop

Work featured on
Bill Moyers Poetry Society of America's series In Their Own Words
Academy of American Poets Poem-a-Day series

Books, chapbooks, CDs, DVDs
2017 Another Way to Say Enter, Collection
2016 Not An Apology, Anthology, Foreword
2015 Pluck!: The Journal of Affrilachian Arts & Culture, Issue 13, Guest Editor
2014 GUAP, Chapbook
2014 Lock and Key, Chapbook
2008 Affrilachian Poets at the Nuyorican Poets Cafe, DVD
2008 Excerpts, Chapbook
2004 Not Another Love Jones, Chapbook
2004 Quickies, CD

References

External links
Official website
Cave Canem
Torch Literary Arts

1977 births
Living people
African-American poets
Affrilachian Poets
American women poets
People from Round Rock, Texas
People from East St. Louis, Illinois
21st-century American poets
21st-century American women writers
21st-century African-American women writers
21st-century African-American writers
20th-century African-American people
20th-century African-American women